Little Swan Lake is an artificial lake in southeastern Warren County in the U.S. state of Illinois, due west of the village of Avon. The lake is impounded by Little Swan Lake Dam, completed in 1967.

References

Bodies of water of Warren County, Illinois
Reservoirs in Illinois